Manhattan Avenue–West 120th–123rd Streets Historic District is a national historic district in Harlem in New York City.  It consists of 113 contributing residential rowhouses built between 1886 and 1896.  The buildings are three story brownstone and brick rowhouses over raised basements in the Queen Anne, Romanesque, and Neo-Grec styles.

It was listed on the National Register of Historic Places in 1992.

References

Queen Anne architecture in New York City
Romanesque Revival architecture in New York City
Greek Revival architecture in New York City
Harlem
Historic districts on the National Register of Historic Places in Manhattan
Historic districts in Manhattan
New York City Designated Landmarks in Manhattan
New York City designated historic districts